Type O Negative were an American gothic metal band formed in Brooklyn, New York City in 1989 by Peter Steele (bass, lead vocals), Kenny Hickey (guitar, co-lead vocals), Josh Silver (keyboards, backing vocals), and Sal Abruscato (drums, percussion), who was later replaced by Johnny Kelly. Their lyrical emphasis on themes of romance, depression, and death resulted in the nickname "the Drab Four" (in homage to the Beatles' "Fab Four" moniker). The band went platinum with 1993's Bloody Kisses, and gold with 1996's October Rust, and gained a fanbase through seven studio albums, two best-of compilations, and concert DVDs.

Steele died on April 14, 2010, at the age of 48; some sources report the cause of death as heart failure brought on by an aortic aneurysm, while others list sepsis caused by diverticulitis. Hickey and Kelly stated in a November 2010 interview with French music magazine Rock Hard that Type O Negative had broken up following Steele's death.

History

Origins (1980s–1991)
Type O Negative was formed after frontman Peter Steele's previous band, Carnivore, broke up. Steele formed a new band with childhood friends Sal Abruscato, Josh Silver, and Kenny Hickey, which they initially named Repulsion. The band later changed their name to Sub-Zero, then changed it again one final time, settling on the name Type O Negative. Steele was still tied to the multi-album contract he had made with Roadrunner Records during his time in Carnivore, despite the fact the band had broken up; after receiving a demo from Type O Negative, Roadrunner decided not to drop Steele, and the band signed to the record label in 1991. Shortly after signing, they released their debut, Slow, Deep and Hard.

Slow, Deep and Hard and The Origin of the Feces (1991–1992)
Type O Negative's first album, Slow, Deep and Hard, incorporated dragging Black Sabbath-esque dirge riffs, maniacal hardcore outbursts, and droning industrial and gothic atmospheres. The songs were long, multi-part theatrical epics, with lyrics loosely surrounding a story involving a man enacting revenge on a cheating girlfriend before ultimately contemplating his actions and committing suicide.

They began creating a new album, with the idea of presenting it as a live album. The subsequent 1992 album was entitled The Origin of the Feces and a warning label was put on the album cover: "Not Live at Brighton Beach". The album contains faux-live recordings of songs from Slow, Deep and Hard, as well as previously unreleased songs such as "Are You Afraid" and "Hey Pete" (a cover of Jimi Hendrix's "Hey Joe" with altered lyrics) and Black Sabbath's "Paranoid".

Bloody Kisses and October Rust (1993–1998)
Type O Negative's third album, Bloody Kisses, was released in 1993 to critical and listener acclaim, and eventually became the first record for Roadrunner to reach certified gold status in the US. The newfound success brought by the album's release reportedly put a lot of pressure on the band; initially, Peter Steele expressed disinterest in touring nationally. Monte Conner, who at the time was Vice President of A&R at Roadrunner, said in a 2018 interview with Revolver Magazine, "There was a lot of pressure for him to take the band to the next level, but he didn't want to quit his job... There was a point where it looked like the band might break up."

Bloody Kisses mostly addressed loneliness and heartbreak, with songs like "Too Late: Frozen", "Blood & Fire" and "Can't Lose You". The organ-driven "Set Me on Fire" is vintage 1960s garage rock, while "Summer Breeze" covered the 1972 Seals and Crofts hit. "Christian Woman" and "Black No. 1 (Little Miss Scare-All)" became the most popular tracks, after having been edited down to radio-friendly lengths (the album versions were 9 and 11 minutes long respectively). In order to promote the album, Type O Negative embarked on a two-year world tour. During this time, the band was featured on MTV, VH1, and in Rolling Stone. In the midst of this media blitz, drummer Sal Abruscato quit the band to join another Brooklyn quartet, Life of Agony. Johnny Kelly, the band's drum technician, was therefore hired as a full-fledged member. Bloody Kisses was re-released a year after the original release in a limited-edition Digipak form, including eight of the musical tracks from the original (omitting the "filler" tracks) and the previously unreleased "Suspended in Dusk".

Type O's October Rust picked up where Bloody Kisses left off, exploring themes of sex, nature and sensuality, first in a humorous sense on the single "My Girlfriend's Girlfriend" and then taken much darker with "Love You to Death". This record also saw a cover of Neil Young's "Cinnamon Girl" as well as the fan favorite, semi-serene "Green Man". While not quite as successful as Bloody Kisses, the album was certified gold in the US, and was the first Type O Negative album to enter the top half of the Billboard Top 200, debuting at No. 42.

World Coming Down and The Least Worst of Type O Negative (1999–2001)
With the completion of another successful world tour, writing for a fifth album began. In the period immediately following the release of October Rust, resulting in 1999's World Coming Down (working titles included Prophets of Doom and Aggroculture).World Coming Down debuted at No. 39 on the Billboard Top 200 charts. World Coming Down featured a much darker, bleak tone than its predecessors, having been written after a series of deaths in frontman Peter Steele's family.

A best of album followed in 2000, entitled The Least Worst of Type O Negative. Although most songs appear on previous albums, many are unreleased remixes or B-sides of previously released singles. Along with these songs are some unreleased numbers from the World Coming Down sessions, the band's cover of "Black Sabbath" by Black Sabbath (Peter Steele's version with different lyrics, written from the perspective of Satan), and a cleaner version of "Hey Pete" (originally released on the mock live album The Origin of the Feces).

Life Is Killing Me and Dead Again (2002–2009)
Type O Negative's sixth studio album, Life Is Killing Me (originally called The Dream Is Dead after the closing song), was released in 2003. For this album, the band picked up the pace of their sound from the dirgeful slowness of World Coming Down. Songs such as "Todd's Ship Gods (Above All Things)", "(We Were) Electrocute", and "I Don't Wanna Be Me" convey the band's classic elements of melody, though the song lengths were much shorter on this outing, the longest being the 7 and a half-minute "How Could She?", a list of female character names from television shows. The album includes a humorous cover of the song "Angry Inch" from the musical Hedwig and the Angry Inch, detailing a sex change operation gone terribly wrong. Type O Negative left Roadrunner after the album's release, having fulfilled their contract for the label.

In June 2004, Type O Negative signed to the Steamhammer imprint of SPV Records. Their only album for the label, Dead Again, was released in 2007. Dead Again debuted at No. 27 in the United States, the band's highest chart debut to date. They also continued to tour through October of that year, including a performance at the Rock am Ring festival in Germany.

Peter Steele's death and the end of Type O Negative (2010)
On April 14, 2010, frontman and bassist Peter Steele died, reportedly from heart failure. The cause of death was later reported to be sepsis, caused by diverticulitis. The following statement concerning Steele was released April 15 on the band's official website:

In a November 2010 interview with Rock Hard magazine, Johnny Kelly and Kenny Hickey confirmed that following Steele's death, Type O Negative had split up.

Roadrunner Records released a box set of all the band's albums (with the exception of Dead Again) for Back to Black Friday 2011, a spinoff of Record Store Day, on November 25, 2011. Each vinyl cover has no text and The Origin of the Feces uses its original cover art. The box set also contains various bumper stickers related to the band.

Influences 
Steele cited Black Sabbath and the Beatles as main influences on Type O Negative. Other influences are Deep Purple, Led Zeppelin, Judas Priest, and AC/DC, and gothic rock/post-punk bands such as Joy Division, Cocteau Twins, Christian Death, Bauhaus, The Sisters of Mercy, Killing Joke, The Cure, The Psychedelic Furs, Clan of Xymox, Swans and Dead Can Dance. In an interview released on September 12, 1999, Steele also cited Laibach, Devo and Depeche Mode as influences. Also the industrial band Einstürzende Neubauten and sixties music in general were an influence on Type O Negative's frontman.

In another interview, in 2003, and in others, he or his bandmates had expressed Steele's appreciation for shoegaze acts like Lush, Curve and My Bloody Valentine and for the New Romantic bands A Flock of Seagulls, Simple Minds and Duran Duran. In a 2017 interview, the drummer Johnny Kelly said that also the grunge bands Alice In Chains and Soundgarden were an influence on the majority of the band.

Soundtracks and covers

Type O Negative's songs have appeared in numerous motion pictures, including "Blood and Fire (Out of the Ashes Remix)" on the 1995 Mortal Kombat movie soundtrack (also on the bonus CD of Life Is Killing Me), "Love You to Death" in Bride of Chucky, "Everyone I Love Is Dead" in Faust: Love of the Damned, "(We Were) Electrocute" in Freddy vs. Jason, and "Summer Breeze" in I Know What You Did Last Summer. As a result of Howard Stern being a self-professed fan, Private Parts: The Album contains "Pictures of Matchstick Men" with the band playing music and Ozzy Osbourne on vocals. "Haunted" also appears on The Blair Witch Project "soundtrack CD" (the album's concept was to contain songs from "a tape that was found in the woods with the students' gear"). In 1998, Arrow Videos made their own version of the 1922 classic horror film Nosferatu by simply overdubbing the silent film with a soundtrack consisting entirely of Type O Negative tracks, taken from the first four albums. This version is now on DVD from DigiView Entertainment, a company that makes budget-priced DVDs. It also has an introduction by actor David Carradine.

In other media, the computer game Descent 2 features a shortened, instrumental version of the track "Haunted". Additionally, Descent 2: The Vertigo Series contains a full-length version of the instrumental; the compilation Duke Nukem: Music to Score By features "Cinnamon Girl (Extended Depression Mix)"; "Love You to Death" in the computer game Blood; "Out of the Fire" from the Life Is Killing Me bonus CD was a theme created for wrestler Kane, but was never used. The opening two seconds of "I Don't Wanna Be Me" were used as a frequent sample in Grand Theft Auto IV, on the Liberty Rock Radio Station, and 2012 video game The Darkness II features Type O Negative's "Black No. 1" in its multiplayer lobby, played at random amongst other songs.

Type O Negative performed and recorded numerous covers. The Doors' "Light My Fire" has been covered live numerous times, mostly during the 1990s. Steele has described the song as "probably the greatest song ever written" before apologizing for having "destroyed it". Seals and Crofts' "Summer Breeze" appears on Bloody Kisses, and Neil Young's "Cinnamon Girl" appears on October Rust. The tongue-in-cheek "Angry Inch" (from Hedwig and the Angry Inch) appears on Life is Killing Me. World Coming Down includes a Beatles medley consisting of "Day Tripper", "If I Needed Someone", and "I Want You (She's So Heavy)". Other covers include a rendition of Black Sabbath's "Paranoid" and "N.I.B."; Status Quo's "Pictures of Matchstick Men" with Ozzy Osbourne, two versions of "Black Sabbath" (one with the original lyrics and one rewritten by Peter Steele to be from Satan's perspective), Jimi Hendrix's "Hey Joe" (rewritten as "Hey Pete"); the Beatles' "Back in the U.S.S.R.", Deep Purple's "Highway Star", Queen's "One Vision", and Creedence Clearwater Revival's "Bad Moon Rising". A medley of Santana's "Evil Ways", "Oye Como Va", and "Black Magic Woman" are also available on the CD accompanying the DVD Symphony for the Devil. The 2007 tour song set started with a cover of "Magical Mystery Tour" from the Beatles.

"In the Flesh", originally written by Pink Floyd from their album The Wall, is another song that Type O Negative covered, used to open their 1999 World Tour. This version can be seen on the live DVD Symphony for the Devil. Also on the same DVD, in "Too Late: Frozen", the intro began with Jethro Tull's "Aqualung".

Discography

Studio albums
 Slow, Deep and Hard (1991)
 The Origin of the Feces (1992)
 Bloody Kisses (1993)
 October Rust (1996)
 World Coming Down (1999)
 Life Is Killing Me (2003)
 Dead Again (2007)

Band members

Final lineup 
 Peter Steele – bass, lead vocals, keyboards (1989–2010; his death)
 Kenny Hickey – guitars, backing vocals, additional co-lead vocals (1989–2010)
 Josh Silver – keyboards, piano, effects, synthesizers, programming, backing vocals (1989–2010)
 Johnny Kelly – drums, backing vocals (1993–2010)

Previous members 
 Sal Abruscato – drums (1989–1993)

Touring 
 Scott Warren – keyboards (2009)

Timeline

Awards and nominations
{| class="wikitable sortable plainrowheaders" 
|-
! scope="col" | Award
! scope="col" | Year
! scope="col" | Nominee(s)
! scope="col" | Category
! scope="col" | Result
! scope="col" class="unsortable"| 
|-
! scope="row" rowspan=4|Žebřík Music Awards
| rowspan=4|1996
| Themselves
| Best International Group
| 
| rowspan=4|
|-
| Peter Steele
| Best International Male
| 
|-
| October Rust
| Best International Album
| 
|-
| "My Girlfriend's Girlfriend"
| Best International Video
|

References

External links
 Last update of official website archived at the Wayback Machine
 Official videos on Roadrunner Records' YouTube channel
 2008 interview

American gothic metal musical groups
Musical groups from Brooklyn
Musical groups established in 1989
Musical groups disestablished in 2010
Musical quartets
Heavy metal musical groups from New York (state)
Roadrunner Records artists
American doom metal musical groups